Stéphane Clamens (born 5 June 1971) is a French sport shooter who specializes in the trap.

At the 2004 Olympic Games he finished in joint seventh place in the trap qualification, missing a place among the top six, who progressed to the final round. He also competed at the 2008 and 2012 Olympic games.

References

1971 births
Living people
French male sport shooters
Shooters at the 2000 Summer Olympics
Shooters at the 2004 Summer Olympics
Shooters at the 2008 Summer Olympics
Shooters at the 2012 Summer Olympics
Olympic shooters of France
Trap and double trap shooters